The 1960 Southern 500, the 11th running of the event, was a NASCAR Grand National Series event that was held on September 5, 1960, at Darlington Raceway in Darlington, South Carolina. Contested over 364 laps on the 1.366-mile (2.198 km) egg-shaped oval, it was the 35th race of the 1960 NASCAR Grand National Series season. 

The race is known as one of the deadliest Southern 500s in history. On lap 95, race leader Bobby Johns and Roy Tyner locked bumpers, and both crashed on pit road. The crash would kill two mechanics and a NASCAR official.

Background 
Darlington Raceway, nicknamed by many NASCAR fans and drivers as "The Lady in Black" or "The Track Too Tough to Tame" and advertised as a "NASCAR Tradition", is a race track built for NASCAR racing located near Darlington, South Carolina. It is of a unique, somewhat egg-shaped design, an oval with the ends of very different configurations, a condition which supposedly arose from the proximity of one end of the track to a minnow pond the owner refused to relocate. This situation makes it very challenging for the crews to set up their cars' handling in a way that will be effective at both ends.

The track is a four-turn 1.366 miles (2.198 km) oval. The track's first two turns are banked at twenty-five degrees, while the final two turns are banked two degrees lower at twenty-three degrees. The front stretch (the location of the finish line) and the back stretch is banked at six degrees. Darlington Raceway can seat up to 60,000 people.

Darlington has something of a legendary quality among drivers and older fans; this is probably due to its long track length relative to other NASCAR speedways of its era and hence the first venue where many of them became cognizant of the truly high speeds that stock cars could achieve on a long track. The track allegedly earned the moniker The Lady in Black because the night before the race the track maintenance crew would cover the entire track with fresh asphalt sealant, in the early years of the speedway, thus making the racing surface dark black. Darlington is also known as "The Track Too Tough to Tame" because drivers can run lap after lap without a problem and then bounce off of the wall the following lap. Racers will frequently explain that they have to race the racetrack, not their competition. Drivers hitting the wall are considered to have received their "Darlington Stripe" thanks to the missing paint on the right side of the car.

Race recap 
It would take 4 hours and 43 minutes to complete the race.

On lap 95, race leader Bobby Johns and Roy Tyner locked bumpers, and both crashed on pit road. The crash would kill two mechanics and a NASCAR official. Johns's car crashed into an observation post, the pit wall retaining wall, and then swiped the pit area where mechanics had just serviced Joe Lee Johnson's car. Paul McDuffie and Charles Sweatland, both mechanics for Joe Lee Johnson's team, were killed. A third, NASCAR official Joe Taylor, was also killed. Three more mechanics and a spectator were injured. Johns would manage to walk away from the incident. Joe Lee Johnson would withdraw from the race.

Race leader Buck Baker, on the last corner of his last lap, had his right rear tire blow out. Meanwhile, second place Rex White was given an early white flag, and Baker had the white flag waved to him twice as he crossed the line with his blown tire. Baker limped his stricken car around the track to complete one more lap, by which time White had crossed the line and been given the checkered flag. NASCAR officials would discover that White had accidentally been awarded an extra lap, and that Baker was forced to run an extra lap. Baker would eventually be declared the winner.

Race results 

NASCAR races at Darlington Raceway
1960 NASCAR Grand National Series
1960 in sports in South Carolina
September 1960 sports events in the United States